Typhonium johnsonianum is a species of plant in the arum family that is endemic to Australia.

Description
The species is a deciduous geophytic, perennial herb, which resprouts annually from a hemispherical, cream-coloured corm. The oval, dull light green leaves are 3.5 cm long by 1.7 cm wide, on a 4 cm long stalk. The flower is enclosed in a green, brown and maroon spathe 5 cm long, appearing in December.

Distribution and habitat
The species is only known from the tropical Top End of the Northern Territory. The type locality is an open grassy clearing between Acacia auriculiformis / Melaleuca forest and Lophostemon lactifluus forest, near the edge of a floodplain, in well-drained sandy soil with a high water table during the wet season.

References

 
johnsonianum
Monocots of Australia
Flora of the Northern Territory
Taxa named by Alistair Hay
Plants described in 1996